Vava may refer to:

People
 Vavá (1934–2002), full name Edvaldo Izidio Neto, Brazilian football striker
 Vavá II (born 1944), Spanish retired footballer
 Vava Suresh (born 1974), Indian wildlife conservationist  and snake expert
 Vavá (footballer, born 1976), full name Marcelo Gonçalves Vieira, Brazilian football striker
 Fedy Vava (born 1982), Vanuatuan football defender
 Vavá Pequeno (born 1994), full name Edley Dos Anjos Pereira Montoia, Santomean football defender
 Vava (rapper) (born 1995), full name Mao Yanqi, Chinese rapper

Places
 Vava (Babušnica), municipality of Babušnica, Serbia

Other uses
 Vava II, superyacht owned by Ernesto Bertarelli